Highway 303 (AR 303, Ark. 303, and Hwy. 303) is a designation for three north–south state highways in Northwest Arkansas. Each connects sparsely populated rural areas to east-west corridors.

Route description

Madison County
Highway 303 begins at Lollar's Creek Road (Madison CR 192) and runs northwest to terminate at Highway 74 east of Wesley.

Washington County

Highway 303 begins at Highway 45 at Mayfield and runs north through unincorporated Washington County to meet US Route 412 at Spring Valley near the historic Spring Valley School. The two routes participate in a  concurrency east until Highway 303 turns north from US  412 near the Madison County line. The route then runs north towards War Eagle and becomes Benton CR 98 which eventually gives access to Highway 12 near Beaver Lake.

Benton County
Highway 303 begins at Highway 12, angling northeast before terminating at Rocky Branch Road (Benton CR 99) near the Rocky Branch School and Beaver Lake.

History
Highway 303 was added to the state highway system as part of a large transfer of county roads to the state system that took place on April 24, 1963. Initially only the portion from Mayfield to the Benton County line was transferred to state maintenance.

Major intersections
Mile markers reset at concurrencies.

See also

 List of state highways in Arkansas

References

External links

303
Transportation in Benton County, Arkansas
Transportation in Madison County, Arkansas
Transportation in Washington County, Arkansas